Michael Martin Hefele (born 1 September 1990) is a German former professional footballer who played as a centre-back. He is now a first team coach at West Bromwich Albion.

Career

In Germany
Hefele made his debut for SpVgg Unterhaching in 2010. He went on to play for SpVgg Greuther Fürth and was on loan at Wacker Burghausen. He played two seasons for Dynamo Dresden scoring ten times in 72 appearances in all competitions and became the club captain.

Huddersfield Town
In July 2016, Hefele joined English Championship side Huddersfield Town Hefele scored his first goal for Huddersfield in a 1–1 draw with Aston Villa on 16 August 2016, just 26 seconds after coming off the bench, a Huddersfield record for the quickest time scored by a debutante in the club's 108-year history. On 28 January 2017, in a game against Rochdale, Hefele was substituted on as a striker in the 46th minute, coming on for Elias Kachunga. He then scored two goals as striker. Eight days later, on 5 February 2017, Hefele scored the winning goal in the 89th minute in a 2–1 victory against Leeds United.

Nottingham Forest
On 9 August 2018, Hefele joined English Championship side Nottingham Forest for an undisclosed fee. He made his debut for Forest on 14 August 2018 in the first round of the 2018–19 EFL Cup against Bury. The game finished 1–1 after 90 minutes with Forest going through to the second round 10–9 on penalties, one of which Hefele scored for Forest. Hefele was frozen out of the Forest first team squad, making his last appearance for the club on 1 January 2019. He saw out his contract and was officially released at the end of the 2020–21 season.

On 25 July 2021, Hefele announced his retirement from playing professional football due to "medical reasons".

Post-retirement
On 26 July 2021, one day after announcing his retirement, he rejoined Huddersfield Town in a newly created role combining coaching with hospitality and ambassadorial roles at the club.
On December 23, 2022, he joined Carlos Corberán at West Bromwich Albion in First Team Assistant Coach role under   Corberán

Career statistics

Honours
Huddersfield Town
 EFL Championship play-offs: 2017

References

External links
 
 

1990 births
Living people
German footballers
Association football defenders
SpVgg Unterhaching II players
SpVgg Unterhaching players
SpVgg Greuther Fürth players
SV Wacker Burghausen players
Dynamo Dresden players
Huddersfield Town A.F.C. players
Nottingham Forest F.C. players
3. Liga players
Regionalliga players
Bundesliga players
2. Bundesliga players
English Football League players
Premier League players
German expatriate footballers
German expatriate sportspeople in England
Expatriate footballers in England
People from Pfaffenhofen (district)
Sportspeople from Upper Bavaria
Footballers from Bavaria